The San Fernando Valley, known locally as the Valley, is an urbanized valley in Los Angeles County, California. Located to the north of the Los Angeles Basin, it contains a large portion of the City of Los Angeles, as well as unincorporated areas and the  incorporated cities of Burbank, Calabasas, Glendale, Hidden Hills, and San Fernando. The valley is well known for its iconic film studios such as Warner Bros. Studio and Walt Disney Studios. In addition, it is home to the Universal Studios Hollywood theme park.

Geography

The San Fernando Valley is about  bound by the Santa Susana Mountains to the northwest, the Simi Hills to the west, the Santa Monica Mountains and Chalk Hills to the south, the Verdugo Mountains to the east, and the San Gabriel Mountains to the northeast. The northern Sierra Pelona Mountains, northwestern Topatopa Mountains, southern Santa Ana Mountains, and Downtown Los Angeles skyscrapers can be seen from higher neighborhoods, passes, roads, and parks in the San Fernando Valley.

The Los Angeles River begins at the confluence of Calabasas Creek (Arroyo Calabasas) and Bell Creek (Escorpión Creek), between Canoga Park High School and Owensmouth Avenue (just north of Vanowen Street) in Canoga Park. These creeks' headwaters are in the Santa Monica Calabasas foothills, the Simi Hills' Hidden Hills, Santa Susana Field Laboratory, and Santa Susana Pass Park lands. The river flows eastward along the southern regions of the Valley. One of the river's two unpaved sections can be found at the Sepulveda Basin. A seasonal river, the Tujunga Wash, drains much of the western facing San Gabriel Mountains and passes into and then through the Hansen Dam Recreation Center in Lake View Terrace. It flows south along the Verdugo Mountains through the eastern communities of the valley to join the Los Angeles River in Studio City. Other notable tributaries of the river include Dayton Creek, Caballero Creek, Bull Creek, Pacoima Wash, and Verdugo Wash.

Most of the San Fernando Valley is within the jurisdiction of the City of Los Angeles, although a few other incorporated cities are located within the valley as well: Burbank is in the southeastern corner of the valley, and San Fernando, which is completely surrounded by the city of Los Angeles, is near the northern end of the valley. Universal City, an enclave in the southern part of the valley, is an unincorporated area housing the Universal Studios filming lot and theme park. Mulholland Drive, which runs along the ridgeline of the Santa Monica Mountains, marks the boundary between the valley and the communities of Hollywood and the Los Angeles Westside.
The San Fernando Valley has connection to other regions: The Santa Clarita Valley via Newhall Pass, the Westside via Sepulveda Pass, Hollywood via Cahuenga Pass, Simi Valley via Santa Susana Pass, and the Crescenta Valley via Interstate 210.

Habitat
The valley's natural habitat is a "temperate grasslands, savannas, and shrublands biome" of grassland, oak savanna, and chaparral shrub forest types of plant community habitats, along with lush riparian plants along the river, creeks, and springs. In this Mediterranean climate, post-1790s European agriculture for the mission's support consisted of grapes, figs, olives, and general garden crops.

Climate
The San Fernando Valley has a subtropical/hot-summer Mediterranean climate, with long, hot, dry summers, and short, warm winters, with chilly nights and sporadic rainfall. Due to its relatively inland location and other factors, summer days are typically hotter and winter nights typically colder than in the Los Angeles basin. more recently, statewide droughts in California have further strained the San Fernando Valley’s and Los Angeles County’s water security.

History

Pre-California statehood
The valley was a center of "the crossroads of cultures and languages, including the Tongva, Fernandeño, and Chumash." The Tongva, later known as the Gabrieleño Mission Indians after colonization, the Tataviam to the north, and Chumash to the west, had lived and thrived in the valley and its arroyos for over 8,000 years. They had numerous settlements, and trading and hunting camps, before the Spanish arrived in 1769 to settle in the Valley, including the village of Pasheeknga.

The first Spanish land grant in the San Fernando Valley (or El Valle de Santa Catalina de Bononia de los Encinos) was called "Rancho Encino" (present-day Mission Hills on the Camino Viejo before Newhall Pass), in the northern part of the San Fernando Valley. Juan Francisco Reyes built an adobe dwelling beside a Tongva village or rancheria at natural springs known as Achooykomenga, but the land was soon taken from him so that a mission could be built there. Mission San Fernando Rey de España was established in 1797 as the 17th of the 21 missions. The land trade granted Juan Francisco Reyes the similarly named Rancho Los Encinos, also beside springs (Los Encinos State Historic Park in present-day Encino). Later the Mexican land grants of Rancho El Escorpión (West Hills), Rancho Providencia and Rancho Cahuenga (Burbank), and Rancho Ex-Mission San Fernando (rest of valley) covered the San Fernando Valley.

The Treaty of Cahuenga, ending the Mexican–American War fighting in Alta California, was signed in 1847 by Californios and Americans at Campo de Cahuenga, the Verdugo Family adobe at the entrance to the Cahuenga Pass in the southeast San Fernando Valley (North Hollywood). The 1848 Treaty of Guadalupe Hidalgo ended the entire war.

California statehood and beyond
The Valley officially became part of the State of California on September 9, 1850, when the California Statehood Act was approved by the federal government.
In 1874, dry wheat farming was introduced by J. B. Lankershim and Isaac Van Nuys, which became very productive for their San Fernando Homestead Association that owned the southern half of the valley. In 1876, they sent the first wheat shipment from both San Pedro Harbor and from the United States to Europe.

20th century

Aqueduct

Through the late-19th-century court decision Los Angeles v. Pomeroy, Los Angeles had won the rights to all surface flow water atop an aquifer beneath the valley, without it being within the city limits. San Fernando Valley farmers offered to buy the surplus aqueduct water, but the federal legislation that enabled the construction of the aqueduct prohibited Los Angeles from selling the water outside of the city limits. This induced several independent towns surrounding Los Angeles to vote on and approve annexation to the city so that they could connect to the municipal water system. These rural areas became part of Los Angeles in 1915.
The aqueduct water shifted farming in the area from dry crops, such as wheat, to irrigated crops, such as corn, beans, squash, and cotton; orchards of apricots, persimmons, and walnuts; and major citrus groves of oranges and lemons. They continued until the next increment of development converted land use, with postwar suburbanization leaving only a few enclaves, such as the "open-air museum" groves at the Orcutt Ranch Park and CSUN campus.

Developments

In 1909, the Suburban Homes Company, a syndicate led by H. J. Whitley, general manager of the board of control, along with Harry Chandler, Harrison Gray Otis, M. H. Sherman, and Otto F. Brant purchased 48,000 acres of the Farming and Milling Company for $2,500,000. Henry E. Huntington extended his Pacific Electric Railway (Red Cars) through the Valley to Owensmouth (now Canoga Park). The Suburban Home Company laid out plans for roads and the towns of Van Nuys, Reseda (Marian), and Canoga Park (Owensmouth). The rural areas were annexed into the city of Los Angeles in 1915. Laurel Canyon and Lankershim in 1923, Sunland in 1926, La Tuna Canyon in 1926, and the incorporated city of Tujunga in an eight-year process lasting from 1927 to 1935. These annexations more than doubled the area of the city.

Two valley cities incorporated independently from Los Angeles: Burbank and San Fernando in 1911. Universal City remains an unincorporated enclave that is home to Universal Studios and became home to Universal CityWalk later in the century. Other unincorporated areas in the valley include Bell Canyon and Kagel Canyon.

The advent of three new industries in the early 20th century—motion pictures, automobiles, and aircraft—also spurred urbanization and population growth. World War II production and the subsequent postwar boom accelerated this growth so that between 1945 and 1960, the valley's population had quintupled. Los Angeles continued to consolidate its territories in the San Fernando Valley by annexing the former Rancho El Escorpión for Canoga Park-West Hills in 1959, and the huge historic Porter Ranch at the foot of the Santa Susana Mountains for the new planned developments in Porter Ranch in 1965.

In the late 1970s, there was a proposed east-west freeway labeled SR 64 that would have cut through the center of the valley from Calabasas in the western end of the valley to the SR-170 and I-5 freeway interchange in Sun Valley, Los Angeles in the eastern end of the valley, but local opposition gained traction and the proposed freeway was never approved or built.

Pop culture
In the 1980s, a distinctive valley youth culture was recognized in the media, particularly in the 1982 Frank Zappa / Moon Zappa song "Valley Girl" and the 1983 film Valley Girl.  These helped fix the socio-economic stereotype of the "Valley girl" into the public consciousness, including a distinct Valley accent.

Northridge earthquake

The 1994 Northridge earthquake struck on January 17 and measured 6.7 on the Moment magnitude scale. It produced the largest ground motions ever recorded in an urban environment and was the first earthquake that had its hypocenter located directly under a U.S. city since the Long Beach earthquake of 1933. It caused the greatest damage in the United States since the 1906 San Francisco earthquake. Although given the name Northridge, the epicenter was located in the community of Reseda, between Arminta and Ingomar streets, just west of Reseda Boulevard. The death toll was 57, and more than 1,500 people were seriously injured. A few days after the earthquake, 9,000 homes and businesses were still without electricity; 20,000 were without gas; and more than 48,500 had little or no water. About 12,500 structures were moderately to severely damaged, which left thousands of people temporarily homeless. Of the 66,546 buildings inspected, 6 percent were severely damaged (red tagged) and 17 percent were moderately damaged (yellow tagged). In addition, damage to several major freeways serving Los Angeles choked the traffic system in the days following the earthquake. Collapses and other severe damage forced closure of portions of 11 major roads to downtown Los Angeles.

This was the second time in 23 years that the San Fernando Valley had been affected by a strong earthquake. The 1971 earthquake caused 58 fatalities and about 2,000 injuries. At the time, the 1971 San Fernando earthquake was the most destructive event to affect greater Los Angeles since the magnitude-6.3 Long Beach earthquake of 1933.

Independence movement
The Valley attempted to secede in the 1970s, but the state passed a law barring city formation without the approval of the City Council. In 1997, Assemblymen Bob Hertzberg and Tom McClintock helped pass a bill that would make it easier for the Valley to secede by removing the City Council veto. AB 62 was signed into law by Governor Pete Wilson. Meanwhile, a grassroots movement to split the Los Angeles Unified School District (LAUSD) and create new San Fernando Valley-based school districts became the focal point of the desire to leave the city. Though the state rejected the idea of Valley-based districts, it remained an important rallying point for Hertzberg's mayoral campaign, which proved unsuccessful.

21st century
By the late 1990s, the San Fernando Valley had become more urban and more ethnically diverse with rising poverty and crime. In 2002, the valley tried to secede from the city of Los Angeles and become its own incorporated city to escape Los Angeles' perceived poverty, crime, gang activity, urban decay, and poorly maintained infrastructure.

In 2002, the San Fernando Valley portion of Los Angeles again seriously campaigned to secede from the rest of the city and become its own new independent and incorporated city. The movement gained some momentum, but measure F did not receive the necessary votes to pass. There were multiple name choices for the new city. "Valley City" was the chosen name for the new city. Among the proposed names for the new city were "Mission Valley", "Rancho San Fernando", "Camelot", or "Townsville".  Since that unsuccessful secession attempt, a new Van Nuys municipal building was built in 2003; the Metro Orange Line opened in October 2005; and 35 new public schools had opened up by 2012.

The NoHo Arts District was established and the name chosen as a reference for its location in North Hollywood and as a play off New York City's arts-centered SoHo District. According to the San Fernando Guide, the change helped develop a "primarily lower to middle-class suburb into … a collection of art and a home for the artists who ply their trade in the galleries, theaters and dance studios in this small annex."

According to the Lake Balboa Neighborhood Council, from 2002 through November 2007 there was a debate about the official recognition of Lake Balboa as a community by the City of Los Angeles. New community names were not sanctioned by the city until January 2006, when the city adopted a formal community-naming process (City of Los Angeles Council File Number 02 -0196). On November 2, 2007, the City Council of Los Angeles approved a motion renaming a larger portion of Van Nuys to Lake Balboa.

By 2017, numerous urban development projects began in the valley, mainly in the Los Angeles neighborhoods of North Hollywood, Panorama City, and Woodland Hills. These projects started with the first few in Woodland Hills and the NoHo West project in North Hollywood began groundbreaking and construction on April 6, 2017.

LA Metro upgraded the Metro G Line in 2021 with at-grade crossing gates and two bridges crossing both Sepulveda and Van Nuys Boulevards, and a full-scale light rail conversion is planned to be completed by 2050. The valley will get its first light rail line in seven decades by 2027, the East San Fernando Light Rail Transit Project. Construction of the line is planned to begin in 2023 along Van Nuys Boulevard and San Fernando Road.

Economy

The Valley is home to numerous companies, the most well known of which work in motion pictures, music recording, and television production. The former movie ranches were branches of original studios now consisting of CBS Studio Center, NBCUniversal, The Walt Disney Company (and its ABC television network), and Warner Bros.

The valley was previously known for advances in aerospace technology and nuclear research by companies such as Lockheed, Rocketdyne and its Santa Susana Field Laboratory, Atomics International, Litton Industries, Marquardt, and TRW's predecessor Thompson Ramo Wooldridge.

Pornography industry 
The valley became the pioneering region for producing adult films in the 1970s and grew to become home to a multibillion-dollar pornography industry, earning the monikers Porn Valley, Silicone Valley (in contrast to Silicon Valley, nickname for the Santa Clara Valley), and San Pornando Valley. The leading trade paper for the industry, AVN magazine, is based in the Northwest Valley, as were a majority of U.S. adult video and magazine distributors. The Paul Thomas Anderson film, Boogie Nights explores these aspects of the valley. According to the HBO series Pornucopia, at one time, nearly 90 percent of all legally distributed pornographic films made in the United States were either filmed in or produced by studios based in the San Fernando Valley. The pornography industry began to decline by the mid-2000s, owing, for the most part, to the growing amount of free content on the Internet, which undercut consumers' willingness to pay. In 2007 industry insiders estimated that revenue for most adult production and distribution companies had declined 30 percent to 50 percent and the number of new films made had fallen sharply. A 2019 article stated that "the porn industry in Budapest is as big as what remains of the industry in California".

Arts and culture

 The Great Wall of Los Angeles – A -long mural designed by Judy Baca and painted on the sides of the Tujunga Wash, depicting the history of California.
 The Mission San Fernando Rey de España - Is a Spanish mission in the Mission Hills district of Los Angeles, California. The mission was founded on September 8, 1797, and was the seventeenth of the twenty-one Spanish missions established in Alta California. Named for Saint Ferdinand, the mission is the namesake of the city of San Fernando and the San Fernando Valley.

Museums
 The Nethercutt Collection – Museum in Sylmar best known for its collection of classic automobiles, also has collections of mechanical musical instruments and antique furniture.
Valley Relics Museum – Museum in Van Nuys dedicated to the history and pop culture of the San Fernando Valley. It was once located in Chatsworth, California. 
 Gordon R. Howard Museum complex in Burbank, California. 
Autry Museum of the American West – near Burbank in Griffith Park.
Travel Town Museum – near Burbank in Griffith Park.
Discovery Cube Los Angeles - Children's museum in Hansen Dam.
The Museum of the San Fernando Valley in Northridge.

Convention center
The San Fernando Valley has a convention center located in the city of Burbank, east of the Burbank Airport, at the Marriott Hotel.

Performing arts venues
 The Starlight Bowl – A 5,000-capacity amphitheater built in 1950, located in Burbank.
 The Valley Performing Arts Center – Located on the CSUN campus, features a 1,700-seat concert hall.

Amusement parks
Busch Gardens, an amusement park in the Van Nuys neighborhood of Los Angeles, was located at the Budweiser brewery but it was torn down in the late 1970s to make room for a massive brewery expansion. Universal Studios Hollywood is in unincorporated Universal City.

Parks and recreation
The San Fernando Valley is home to numerous neighborhood city parks, recreation areas and large Regional Open Space preserves. Many preserves are maintained as public parkland by the National Park Service's Santa Monica Mountains National Recreation Area, the California State Parks, and local county and municipal parks districts.

Small garden parks and missions

 The Japanese Garden
 The gardens at Adobes
 The Orcutt Ranch Horticulture Center
 The Leonis Adobe
 The Andrés Pico adobe
 Los Encinos State Historic Park
 Mission San Fernando

Recreation areas

 Griffith Park, located at the southeastern end of the valley in the Hollywood Hills
 Sepulveda Dam recreation area
 Hansen Dam recreation area
 Los Angeles River, with parks of various sizes along the part of the river located in the valley

Mountain open-space parks

 Backbone Trail System
 Bell Canyon Park
 Brand Park
 Chatsworth Park South
 Deervale-Stone Canyon Park
 Deukmejian Wilderness Park
 El Escorpión Park
 Juan Bautista de Anza National Historic Trail
 La Tuna Park
 Laurel Canyon Park
 Marvin Braude Mulholland Gateway Park
 O'Melveny Park above Granada Hills
 Rocky Peak Park
 Sage Ranch Park (located in Simi Valley)
 San Vicente Mountain Park, above Encino
 Santa Susana Pass State Historic Park
 Topanga State Park
 Upper Las Virgenes Canyon Open Space Preserve
 Verdugo Mountains Open Space Preserve
 Wilacre Park
 Wildwood Canyon Park, above Burbank
 Wilson Canyon Park, above Sylmar

Education
Public schools in the San Fernando Valley are served by three unified school districts; The Northwest and East Regions of the Los Angeles Unified School District, the Glendale Unified School District and the Burbank Unified School District. There are four community colleges in the valley; Los Angeles Valley College in Valley Glen, Los Angeles Mission College in Sylmar, and Los Angeles Pierce College in Woodland Hills. All except Glendale College are served by the Los Angeles Community College District. The only state university in the San Fernando Valley is California State University Northridge in Northridge.

In 1994 there were 180,000 PK-12 students attending Los Angeles Unified School District (LAUSD) campuses in the Valley. During the same year, about 45,000 PK-12 students, or one in five of all such students, attended the over 200 private schools in the Valley.

Government

Representation
The Los Angeles city section of the valley is divided into seven city council districts: 2, 3, 4, 5, 6, 7, and 12. Of the 95 neighborhood councils in the city, 34 are in the valley. The valley is represented in the California State Legislature by five members of the State Assembly: Jesse Gabriel (D), Luz Rivas (D), Adrin Nazarian (D), Suzette Martinez Valladares (R), and Laura Friedman (D). The valley is represented by three members of the State Senate: Henry Stern (D), Bob Hertzberg (D) and Anthony Portantino (D). The valley falls into five congressional districts: the 25th, 28th, 29th, 30th, and 33rd, represented respectively by Mike Garcia (R), Adam Schiff (D), Tony Cárdenas (D), Brad Sherman (D), and Ted Lieu (D). The valley is represented in the Los Angeles County Board of Supervisors, by two supervisorial districts, with the western portion represented by Sheila Kuehl (D) and the eastern portion by Kathryn Barger (R). Residents are also represented by the neighborhood councils of Los Angeles

Incorporated cities (independent)

 Burbank
 Calabasas
 Glendale
 Hidden Hills
 Los Angeles
 San Fernando

Unincorporated communities

 Universal City
 West Chatsworth

City of Los Angeles neighborhoods of the San Fernando Valley

 Arleta
 Canoga Park
 Chatsworth
 Encino
 Granada Hills
 Lake Balboa
 Lake View Terrace
 Mission Hills
 NoHo Arts District
 North Hills
 North Hollywood
 Northridge
 Pacoima
 Panorama City
 Porter Ranch
 Reseda
 Shadow Hills+
 Sherman Oaks
 Sherwood Forest
 Studio City
 Sun Valley
 Sunland-Tujunga+
 Sylmar
 Tarzana
 Toluca Lake
 Toluca Terrace
 Toluca Woods
 Valley Glen
 Valley Village
 Van Nuys
 Warner Center
 West Hills
 Winnetka
 Woodland Hills

+ These communities are also included in the Crescenta Valley.Infrastructure
Transportation

Freeways
Major freeways cross the Valley, including Interstate 405 (San Diego Freeway), U.S. Route 101 (Ventura Freeway/Hollywood Freeway), State Route 118 (Ronald Reagan Freeway), State Route 170 (Hollywood Freeway), Interstate 210 (Foothill Freeway), and Interstate 5 (Golden State Freeway). Notable streets include Sepulveda Boulevard, Ventura Boulevard, Laurel Canyon Boulevard, San Fernando Road, Victory Boulevard, Reseda Boulevard, Riverside Drive, Mulholland Drive, and State Route 27 (Topanga Canyon Boulevard).

Rapid transit
Subway, dedicated transitway, and express and local buses, provided by many agencies, serve the San Fernando Valley. Some of the former rights-of-way of the Pacific Electric Railway, which first accelerated population growth in the Valley, have been repurposed for busways and light rail lines.

The Los Angeles County Metropolitan Transportation Authority operates two Metro B Line subway stations in the Valley, which are located at Universal City and North Hollywood, which connect it directly to Hollywood and Downtown Los Angeles. The Metro B Line is the first heavy rail subway in the valley, extended from its prior terminus in 2000. With transfers, it connects the Valley to the entire Metro regional light rail and subway network. The B Line's two Valley subway stations provide access to national travel through Bob Hope Airport and Amtrak and regional travel through Metrolink, Metro Rapid, Metro Local, and the Metro G Line. Metro approved a new light rail line, the East San Fernando Valley Transit Corridor that will run north–south on Van Nuys Boulevard from the G Line Van Nuys station to the Sylmar/San Fernando Metrolink station, however will be built in two phases. The first between Van Nuys and Pacoima, and the second from Pacoima to Sylmar/San Fernando station. Pre construction began in 2022, and is expected to be completed between 2028 and 2030.

The G Line busway uses a dedicated transitway route running the east–west length of the Valley connecting the North Hollywood B Line Station through the valley, then heads north through Canoga Park to the Chatsworth Metrolink station.

An additional Metro Busway line is planned for the Valley operating from North Hollywood station: the North Hollywood–Pasadena Transit Line which will run to Pasadena with connections to the L Line. Metro is also studying a route through the Sepulveda Pass, the Sepulveda Pass Transit Corridor, including heavy rail and monorail alternatives.

Rail and air
Metrolink commuter rail has two Valley lines, the Antelope Valley Line and Ventura County Line, which connect the Valley and beyond to downtown Los Angeles and south, becoming one line at the Downtown Burbank station. Metrolink always had one Burbank Airport station on the Ventura County Line, but a second Burbank Airport station was built in 2017 on the Antelope Valley Line.

Amtrak's Pacific Surfliner long-distance rail line has stops at Burbank Airport station, Van Nuys, and Chatsworth Station, before proceeding on to Ventura County, Santa Barbara, and Northern California or Union Station and San Diego.

The California High-Speed Rail Authority was planning two stations in the Valley, one in Burbank and the other in Sylmar, but the proposed Sylmar high-speed rail station was canceled owing to local opposition from the city of San Fernando. As of now, there's only one planned station in the valley, located in Burbank with an initial section of the railroad possibly opening in 2029.

The Valley's two major airports are Hollywood Burbank Airport and the Van Nuys Airport. The Van Nuys–Airport FlyAway Terminal provides nonstop scheduled shuttle service to LAX and back to the valley, with parking.

Utilities
Most of the utilities in the valley are served by public municipal governments, primarily the cities of Los Angeles, and Burbank, while there are only two private-owned utilities for gas and electricity in the valley as well. Southern California Edison has their overhead power lines going through the city of Burbank and through the Los Angeles city neighborhoods of Sylmar, Mission Hills, Arleta, North Hollywood, Studio City, Woodland Hills, Granada Hills, Porter Ranch, and Chatsworth as well. Internet, cable television, and cellular phone service in the valley are by large private companies.

The valley is served by the following utility companies:

Electricity

 Los Angeles Department of Water and Power (serves the entire Los Angeles city section of the valley, which is two thirds of the land area, and is also the largest electric utility in the San Fernando Valley)
 Burbank Water and Power
 Southern California Edison (serves the cities of San Fernando, Calabasas, and Hidden Hills)

Natural gas

 Southern California Gas Company

Water

 Los Angeles Department of Water and Power (serves the entire Los Angeles city section of the valley, which is two thirds of the land area)
 Burbank Water and Power
 City of San Fernando
 Metropolitan Water District

Internet and Cable Television

 AT&T
 Frontier Communications
 Charter Communications (Spectrum)

Cell Phone Service

 AT&T
 T-Mobile
 Cricket Wireless
 Verizon Wireless

Sanitation

 City of Los Angeles
 City of San Fernando (Republic Services, Inc.'')
 City of Burbank

Healthcare

There are two Kaiser Permanente hospitals serving the San Fernando Valley, one in Panorama City and one in Woodland Hills. Also, there are two Providence hospitals, in Burbank and Mission Hills. Besides Kaiser Permanente and Providence hospitals, most of the valley is served by non-profit hospitals such as: Valley Presbyterian Hospital in Van Nuys, Northridge Hospital Medical Center in Northridge, Olive View – UCLA Medical Center in Sylmar, Encino Hospital Medical Center in Encino, Providence Tarzana Medical Center in Tarzana, and Sherman Oaks Hospital in Sherman Oaks.

Services 
The Los Angeles satellite administrative center for the valley, The Civic Center Van Nuys, is in Van Nuys. The area in and around the Van Nuys branch of Los Angeles City Hall is home to a police station, limited and unlimited jurisdiction superior courts and Los Angeles city and county administrative offices.

Branches of the Los Angeles Public Library and independent city's libraries service the residents.

Los Angeles Police Department, Los Angeles County Sheriff's Department, and independent valley city departments. Los Angeles Fire Department, Los Angeles County Fire Department, Burbank Police Department, and independent valley city departments.

Demographics

As of 2012 the population of the San Fernando Valley was 1.77 million, of which 41.8 percent were Hispanic or Latino, 41.0 percent were non-Hispanic white, 12.7 percent were Asian and 4.6 percent were African Americans. The largest city located entirely in the valley is Burbank, with over 107,000 residents. The most populous districts of Los Angeles in the Valley are Van Nuys and Pacoima, which like the city of Burbank have more than 100,000 residents each. Despite the San Fernando Valley's reputation for sprawling, low-density development, the valley communities of Panorama City, North Hollywood, Van Nuys, Reseda, Canoga Park, and Northridge, all in Los Angeles, have numerous apartment complexes and contain some of the densest census tracts in Los Angeles.

The San Fernando Valley has a significant population below the poverty level. About 30 percent of Valley households in 2009 earned less than $35,000 a year, including 10 percent who made less than $15,000 a year.
The Pacoima district, once considered the hub of suburban blight and of having the highest poverty rate, is no longer such. Other San Fernando Valley neighborhoods such as North Hollywood, Panorama City, and Arleta now have poverty rates which are higher.
 
In general, the areas with lower poverty rates have become fewer and more scattered, while many of the now affluent communities have become compartmented, having their own private, planned and gated communities. Many of these tend to be on or near the borders of the Valley in the foothill regions.

See also

Places
 CSUN Botanic Garden
 Forest Lawn Memorial Park (Hollywood Hills)
 The Los Angeles Zoo and Botanical Gardens
 Nestor Studios, valley ranch
 Providencia Ranch, Oak Crest

Information
 Geography of Los Angeles County
 List of Los Angeles Historic-Cultural Monuments in the San Fernando Valley
 Los Angeles Times suburban sections

References

Further reading

External links

 
 San Fernando Valley website
 CSUN Digital Library: San Fernando Valley online Archives: vintage photos-maps-histories.
 CSUN: San Fernando Valley Statistics website
 CSUN San Fernando Valley Economic Research Center website
 Bike Travel in the San Fernando Valley and Biking in the SFV — Shortcuts

 
Valleys of Los Angeles County, California
 
Los Angeles County, California regions
Separatism in the United States
Valleys of California